This is a list of Bien de Interés Cultural landmarks in the Province of Barcelona, Catalonia, Spain.

Castell de Santa Florentina, Canet de Mar
 Chapel of Santa Àgata
 Church of Santa Anna
 Monumental church complex of Sant Pere de Terrassa
 Monestir de Sant Llorenç del Munt
 Sant Miquel del Fai
 Santa Maria de Serrateix
 Sant Pere de Casserres

References 

 
Barcelona